Amet is a town and a municipality located in Rajsamand district in the Indian state of Rajasthan.

History
Amet is historically significant. Amet was estate under erstwhile Mewar state, consisted of 26 villages. It was owned by Chundawats, descendants of Chunda Sisodia, son of Maharana Lakha, with title of Rawat. Patta Sisodia great-grandson of Chunda Sisodia. who fought against Mughals in Chittorgarh fort, during the reign of Maharana of Mewar Udai Singh. Patta's son, Karan Singh was granted Amet by Maharana Pratap.

Demographics
 India census, Amet had a population of 16,669. Males constitute 51% of the population and females 49%. Amet has an average literacy rate of 66%, higher than the national average of 59.5%; with 59% of males and 41% of females literate. 15% of the population is under 6 years of age.

Tourist places

Vevar Mahadev
Vevar Mahadev is a temple of Shiva and a popular tourist attraction. It is situated near the bank of the river Chandrabhaga surrounded by the Aravali hills and great amount of greenery & seasonal water filled anicut makes it a perfect place for all those who want to go near to nature and peace.

Jaisingh Shyam Ji temple
The temple of Lord Jaisingh Shyam Ji stands in the heart of Amet. Small lakes include Ranerao Lake, Salam Sagar, Pratap Sagar, and two anicuts near Karani Mata Bagh and Vevar Mahadev. Veer Patta was the noble of Thikana Amet and one of the heroes during the third johar of Chittor. His statute has been installed at Veer Patta Circle on the Amet-Kelwa road. The palace Amet is also a historical place to visit . Wadli Wavli is also good place where the temples of Lord Shanker and Hanumanji are situated. Shiv Nal and Shim Mataji are also very picturesque places near Amet.

Lakes
There are a few small lakes, which fills during good monsoon -Ranerao lake, Salam sagar, Pratap sagar and two anicuts near Karani Mata bagh and Vevar Mahadev.

Cattle fair
Every year during Navratri festival five-day cattle fair is organised. All nearby villages take part in it. It is held at mela ground opposite choti shikarbadi. Jaljulani ekadassi is also celebrated with great fervour and devotion.

Laxmi bazar
The textile cloth market laxami bazar is a hot place for nearby villages. Jaisinghshyam goshala on Jilola rd is also a pleasant place to relax in Amet. Festival of Rangpanchmi is celebrated with great interest and colourfulness .

Economy 
Amet is famous for its Marble & Granite Business and its major source of economy. There are currently more than 50 marble & granite processing units are working along the Amet-Kelwa road.

Other than marble, it used to be famous Kapda Mandi (Cloth Market) for nearby area of approx 100 km radius. It is still the second major source of town's economy.

References

External links 
 http://www.ametnagar.com

Cities and towns in Rajsamand district